Caitlin's Way (aired in Australia under the title Just a Kid) is a live action teen drama series that aired on Nickelodeon from 2000 to 2002. The show was co-created by Thomas W. Lynch.

Premise
Caitlin's Way focuses on Caitlin Seeger (played by Lindsay Felton), a troubled girl who lives on the streets of Philadelphia. After being arrested, Caitlin is given the option of going to a youth detention center or moving in with her mother Katherine's cousin in Montana during her meeting with a judge. She chooses the latter; upon moving in with Dori, Jim, and Griffen on their ranch, she experiences culture shock. Caitlin, still distraught about her mother Katherine's unexpected death when Caitlin was eight, seeks a loving family and a permanent home. The ranch was actually near High River in southeastern Alberta, Canada. There were scenes shot in town (around the many murals, as well as in local schools), and in Calgary where the C-Train was occasionally seen in the background.

Characters

Main characters 
Caitlin Seeger
 Played by Lindsay Felton
Caitlin Seeger is a 14-year-old girl who has been in and out of foster homes since age eight, when her mother Katherine suddenly died. Her father had left when she was four. Caitlin, still angry about her mother's death, hides her grief in her tough-girl persona and gets into trouble frequently. She loves photography and is usually seen with her camera which once belonged to her mother. Her dream is to become a professional photographer. After getting in trouble and expelled from her Catholic school, Caitlin is given the option of going to a juvenile detention facility or going to live with her mother Katherine's cousin Dori Lowe (whom Caitlin did not even know existed), her husband Jim and their son Griffen in Montana by the judge that she meets with. Caitlin agrees to go to Montana. While there, she meets and rescues a stallion from wranglers whom she names Bandit. As time goes by, the Lowes and Caitlin learn to accept each other and Caitlin gets what she's always wanted for a long time: a loving family and a permanent home. She loves to read and her best subject in school is English; her worst is math. The locket that Caitlin wears 24/7 is the same locket that her mother used to wear and she is often seen listening to her mini CD player. Caitlin used to play soccer and she associates the sport with her mom because the last time Caitlin played soccer with her best friend was the day that her mom Katherine died. Caitlin's favorite color is black.

Dori Lowe
 Played by Cynthia Belliveau
Dori Lowe is Jim's wife, Griffin's mom, the cousin of Caitlin's mother Katherine, and a veterinarian. She suggests that Caitlin come to live with them. Dori told Caitlin once that she and her mother never really had much contact which is why they did not know about her until recently. She has a home office and works with most of the animals there are in High River. As a loving mother, Dori tries to warm up to Caitlin by acting like her mother figure, which has at times Caitlin resents since she doesn't want anybody taking her mom's place and causes her to push Dori away at times and has even hurt her feelings with things she has said about her. Caitlin eventually learned the truth about her mother's death from Dori who tells her she died from an Aneurysm that killed her instantly. Caitlin breaks down over hearing this and Dori says she assumed that Caitlin knew. Caitlin admits to her that nobody had ever told her. The two eventually become closer throughout the show and Caitlin finally accepts Dori as her new mother figure after Dori explains that she wants to be a mother to Caitlin, but not be one that replaces her own mother. In high school, Dori was on the girls' soccer team but wasn't very good so she Dori had to work particularly hard to stay on the team.

Jim Lowe
Played by Ken Tremblett
Jim Lowe is Dori's husband, Griffin's father, and the local sheriff. Caitlin sees him as the only strong father figure she has had in her entire life since her own father left her. Jim is a loving father and husband, always willing to help his family out whenever they need him. When Caitlin first comes to live with them, the two of them feel awkward around each other, but they eventually come past that. Jim loves Caitlin as his if she was his own daughter and does whatever he can to help her.

Griffen Lowe
Played by Jeremy Foley
Griffen Lowe is the 14-year-old son of Jim and Dori and Caitlin's second cousin. He is a very smart kid, always earning straight A's. Griffen's hobbies include computers, riding his bike, playing the guitar, and singing in a band with his best friends Brett and Eric called Bad Hygiene. When he first learned that Caitlin would come to live with them, he wasn't too happy about it. The two of them often get into fights and Griffen will usually make cruel remarks about her past to anger Caitlin. Despite all the arguing, they eventually form a brother and sister like relationship and become each other's best friends. They will always help each other out, no matter what the situation is or how much trouble they get into. He is often the voice of reason for Caitlin and he's always there to give advice to her and has admitted to her that he never likes it when she is sad, but is always there to comfort her.

Bandit
Bandit is a wild Buckskin stallion whom Caitlin helps rescue from wranglers who soon later rescues her from a rabid wolf and the two soon bond. He belongs to Caitlin as of "Stray Part 3." Dori allows her to keep him after Bandit doesn't show any signs of Rabies. Caitlin decides to name him Bandit, after a horse that was in a story her mother used to read to her when she was little. Except when she's grounded, Caitlin usually rides Bandit every day. In "The Present Part 1" Will and Sarah thinking Bandit was their colt that ran away almost took him from Caitlin, but in "The Present Part 2" Will sees how much Caitlin loves him and that she has given him a good home and allows her to keep him. Bandit almost died at the end of Season 1 after he got his leg caught in a rusty old bear trap, but Dori saved his life.

Cousin
Cousin is Griffen's dog. He's very friendly and loves everybody. During "Making Allowances," when Caitlin brought Cousin into the store, he caused a ruckus. After Season 1, Cousin isn't seen or mentioned again.

Alfalfa
Alfalfa is Caitlin's Calico cat. Dori comes up with Alfalfa's name while she's bottle feeding her after she's born. We meet her in Season 2. In Season 3, Caitlin decides to give Alfalfa to Ruth to replace her cat Mortimer, but when she gets to Ruth's house, she finds her dead and as a result she gets to keep her kitten.

Secondary characters
Brett Stevens
Played by Stephen Warner
Brett Stevens is Griffen's best friend. He plays the bass in their band "Bad Hygiene" and is on the basketball team at High River High School. He has a little sister named Julie and a girlfriend named Taylor. Brett and Taylor broke up twice, but eventually got back together for good in Season 2. His dream is to play in the NBA after he graduates from high school. Like Griffen and Eric, Brett loves riding his bike.

Taylor Langford
Played by Tania Saulnier
Taylor Langford is Brett's girlfriend, Caitlin's rival but in a few episodes they both bond a little bit, and Griffen's main love interest during Season 1. Taylor's on the cheerleading squad and the girls' soccer team and is perhaps the biggest snob at High River High School. Taylor and her mother had won the mother-daughter horse race every year until Caitlin and Dori broke their streak. She is a complicated character: In "All About Caitlin," we learn that Taylor changes best friends every week and that her father doesn't give her enough love. Her goal in life is to be an entertainment lawyer. Taylor and Griffen become friends in "All About Caitlin". Taylor just wants Caitlin to be normal. Taylor's favorite color is pink.

Eric Anderson
Played by Brendan Fletcher
Eric Anderson is Griffen's other best friend and Caitlin's other rival. Eric plays the drums in their band "Bad Hygiene," and he's on the High River High School football team. Griffin has known Eric since kindergarten. Like Taylor, he is a complicated character: it is inferred that he acts like a jerk because his father is always putting him down. His dream is to own a cattle ranch and maybe open up a Cow Boy themed restaurant after graduation. Like Griffen and Brett, Eric loves riding his bike.

Annie
Played by Julianna Enciu
Annie is Caitlin's new best friend and Griffen's new main love interest. We meet her in "Caitlin's First Dance". At first, Annie is visiting High River for the weekend, but then she and her family ultimately move to High River. Annie takes Caitlin's place as the new kid at High River High School. Annie loves horses and she was going to take lessons with her best friend Janet before she moved to High River. Annie's good at dancing. Annie works as a part-time Waitress at the diner. Caitlin filled in for Annie once so that she could attend her cousin's wedding. When Annie meets Caitlin, she befriends her and she's the only one who likes Caitlin and accepts her for who she is. After Season 1, Annie isn't seen or mentioned again.

Julie Stevens
Played by Alexandra Purvis
Episodes: "Little Sister" and "All About Caitlin"
Julie Stevens is Brett's little sister, whose dream is to do Barrel racing. She has an American Paint Horse named Patches. Julie's parents almost sold Patches because his upkeep was so expensive, and Julie was heartbroken at the thought of losing Patches forever. Caitlin helped arrange for Patches to be boarded at the Lowe Ranch. As a result, Julie looks up to Caitlin and thinks she is cool. After "All About Caitlin," Julie isn't seen again and after "Solo," Julie isn't mentioned again.

Jordan Clarke
Played by Sean Amsing
Jordan Clarke is one of Caitlin's friends. We meet him in Season 1. Jordan loves to play basketball and he's good at rapping. Jordan became hooked on rap when he went to a football game with his mom when he was five. Jordan saw some break dancers during half time so he jumped out of his seat and tried to mimick their moves. Then Jordan fell and knocked out three of his teeth. He wants to be a rapper when he grows up. In "The Present Part 2" at school the next day when it seems that Caitlin's going to lose Bandit forever Jordan performs a Birthday Rap that he wrote for Caitlin to cheer her up.

Nikki
Played by Alana Husband
Season 2 – Season 3
Nikki is Griffen's ex-girlfriend. They got together in Season 2, but they broke up in "Juliet & Her Romeo," because they never hung out anymore due to Griffen constantly hanging out with Brett and Eric. However, Nikki and Griffen are still friends. She plays the clarinet in the High River High School band.

Will Findlay
Played by Jason McSkimming
Season 2 – Season 3
Will Findlay is Caitlin's main love interest and a misunderstood bad boy. He is introduced in "The Present Part 1". He and Caitlin share a lot in common (loss of a parent, moved around a lot, etc.) His mother, Sarah is a mean snob that often neglects Will. Will has a new horse named Sinbad. Will dated Taylor for a little while to get back at Caitlin for doing the right thing after they ruined Eric's crop when Will talked Caitlin into skipping Summer school after she failed math. Will's best subject in school is math. Caitlin helped Will change after his motorcycle accident when he admitted to her that he'd hurt Sarah emotionally to get back at her for not being there for him. In "Burned," Caitlin and Will kiss for the first time. Due to the series being cancelled after 3 seasons, we'll never know if Caitlin and Will became a couple.

Garth Crowchild
Played by Nathaniel Arcand
Season 1
Garth is Jim's Native American assistant and his best friend. Garth is one of the local Cops in High River. Garth saved Caitlin's life after she stole Jim and Dori's new Jeep and got into a car accident. Luckily, Caitlin was wearing her Seat belt when the accident happened. Garth has a very interesting relationship with Caitlin. After Season 1, Garth isn't seen or mentioned again.

Guest stars
Danny O'Donoghue
Played by Danny O'Donoghue
Season 3
Danny O'Donoghue is Caitlin's former foster brother. We meet him in Season 3. Caitlin and Danny used to live in the same foster home, and Danny would always try to keep Caitlin out of trouble since he's older. One day Danny couldn't take it anymore and took off. Danny eventually joined MyTown, but he has since gone on to join The Script.

David Seeger
Played by Joe-Norman Shaw
Episodes: "The Promise Part 1" and "The Promise Part 2"
David Seeger is Caitlin's long lost dad and Katherine's husband, first appearing in "The Promise Part 1". David left Caitlin and her mother Katherine when she was four years old, and she had not seen him ever since and is still bitter towards him for leaving. In Season 1, Caitlin tried to find him, but changed her mind at the last minute because she got scared. David's a sculptor. David was falsely accused of running a counterfeit scam in High River. After a fight with Caitlin when he missed the Father – Daughter hockey tournament, he almost left High River, but the two of them eventually made things right. David admitted to Caitlin that he has always felt guilty about leaving Caitlin and her mother Katherine, but explains to her why he did. David moved to High River in "The Promise Part 2".

Episodes

Season 1 (2000)

Season 2 (2000–01)

Season 3 (2001–02)

Broadcast history 
In addition to airing on Nickelodeon, the show was also telecast in Canada on YTV.
Nickelodeon cancelled the show after ratings fell and the show changed direction. New episodes were shown throughout early 2002. It also aired on CH and on The N. Although it is a Nickelodeon series, Disney Channel aired it in the UK and Ireland, and the Middle East.

References

External links
 Caitlin's Way at Nickelodeon
 

2000s Nickelodeon original programming
2000s American teen sitcoms
2000s American teen drama television series
2000s American high school television series
2000 American television series debuts
2002 American television series endings
2000s Canadian teen sitcoms
2000s Canadian teen drama television series
2000s Canadian high school television series
2000 Canadian television series debuts
2002 Canadian television series endings
YTV (Canadian TV channel) original programming
English-language television shows
Television series about siblings
Television series about families
Television series about teenagers
Television shows set in Montana